is a former Japanese football player. His elder brother Kyohei Yamagata is also a former footballer.

Playing career
Yamagata was born in Kitakyushu on October 4, 1983. After graduating from high school, he joined J2 League club Albirex Niigata in 2002. He played several matches as right side back from first season. In 2004, he moved to Albirex Niigata Singapore. In 2005, he returned to Japan and joined Avispa Fukuoka. His elder brother Kyohei also played for Avispa from 2004 to 2007. Although Yamagata could not play many matches until 2006, he became a regular as right side back in 2007 and Avispa was promoted to J1 League end of 2010 season. However Avispa was returned to J2 in a year end of 2011 season. In 2012, he moved to J2 club Tochigi SC. He played many matches every seasons. However Tochigi finished at the bottom place in 2015 season and was relegated to J3 League. In 2017, he moved to J3 club Kataller Toyama. He retired end of 2017 season.

Club statistics

References

External links

1983 births
Living people
Association football people from Fukuoka Prefecture
Japanese footballers
J1 League players
J2 League players
J3 League players
Singapore Premier League players
Albirex Niigata players
Albirex Niigata Singapore FC players
Avispa Fukuoka players
Tochigi SC players
Kataller Toyama players
Association football defenders